Wright-Patterson Air Force Base (WPAFB)  is a United States Air Force base and census-designated place just east of Dayton, Ohio, in Greene and Montgomery counties. It includes both Wright and Patterson Fields, which were originally Wilbur Wright Field and Fairfield Aviation General Supply Depot.

The host unit at Wright-Patterson AFB is the 88th Air Base Wing (88 ABW), assigned to the Air Force Life Cycle Management Center and Air Force Materiel Command. The 88 ABW operates the airfield, maintains all infrastructure and provides security, communications, medical, legal, personnel, contracting, finance, transportation, air traffic control, weather forecasting, public affairs, recreation and chaplain services for more than 60 associate units.

The base's origins begin with the establishment of Wilbur Wright Field on 22 May and McCook Field in November 1917, both established by the Aviation Section, U.S. Signal Corps as World War I installations. McCook was used as a testing field and for aviation experiments. Wright was used as a flying field (renamed Patterson Field in 1931); Fairfield Aviation General Supply Depot; armorers' school, and a temporary storage depot. McCook's functions were transferred to Wright Field when it was closed in October 1927. Wright-Patterson AFB was established in 1948 as a merger of Patterson and Wright Fields.

In 1995, negotiations to end the Bosnian War were held at the base, resulting in the Dayton Agreement that ended the war.

The 88th Air Base Wing is commanded by Col. Christopher B. Meeker. Its Command Chief Master Sergeant is Chief Master Sergeant Lloyd E. Morales. The base had a total of 27,406 military, civilian and contract employees in 2010. The Greene County portion of the base is a census-designated place (CDP), with a resident population of 1,821 at the 2010 census.

History

Prehistoric Indian mounds of the Adena culture at Wright-Patterson are along P Street and, at the Wright Brothers Memorial, a hilltop mound group.

Aircraft operations on land now part of Wright-Patterson Air Force Base began in 1904–1905 when Wilbur and Orville Wright used an  plot of Huffman Prairie for experimental test flights with the Wright Flyer III. Their flight exhibition company and the Wright Company School of Aviation returned 1910–1916 to use the flying field.

World War I transfers of land that later became WPAFB include  (including the Huffman Prairie Flying Field) along the Mad River leased to the Army by the Miami Conservancy District, the adjacent  purchased by the Army from the District for the Fairfield Aviation General Supply Depot, and a  complex for McCook Field just north of downtown Dayton between Keowee Street and the Great Miami River. In 1918, Wilbur Wright Field agreed to let McCook Field use hangar and shop space as well as its enlisted mechanics to assemble and maintain airplanes and engines under the direction of Chief of Air Service Mason Patrick.

After World War I, 347 German aircraft were brought to the United States—some were incorporated into the Army Aeronautical Museum (in 1923 the Engineering Division at McCook Field "first collected technical artifacts for preservation"). The training school at Wilbur Wright Field was discontinued. Wilbur Wright Field and the depot merged after World War I to form the Fairfield Air Depot.

In 1924, the Committee presented the deeds to president Calvin Coolidge for the construction of a new aviation engineering center. The entire acreage (including the Fairfield Air Depot) was designated Wright Field, which had units such as the Headquarters, 5th Division Air Service (redesignated 5th Division Aviation in 1928), and its 88th Observation Squadron and 7th Photo Section. New facilities were built 1925–27 on the portion of Wright Field west of Huffman Dam to house all of the McCook Field functions being relocated.

Wright and Patterson fields
Wright Field was "formally dedicated" on 12 October 1927 when "the Materiel Division moved from McCook Field to the new site" At the time of the dedication expenditures of approximately $5 million had been involved in the new facility after 18 months work, with the total amount expected to rise to between $7 and $8 million. The ceremonies included the John L. Mitchell Trophy Race (won by Lt. I. A. Woodring of the 1st Pursuit Group—Speed: 158.968 mph) and Orville Wright raising the flag over the new engineering center.

On 1 July 1931, the portion of Wright Field east of Huffman Dam (land known today as Areas A and C of Wright-Patterson Air Force Base which included the Fairfield Air Depot and the Huffman Prairie Flying Field) was redesignated "Patterson Field" in honor of Lieutenant Frank Stuart Patterson. Lt. Patterson was the son of Frank J. Patterson, co-founder of National Cash Register. 

Shortly before the end of WW1, 1Lt Patterson and observer 2Lt LeRoy Swan, both of the 137th Aero Squadron, were killed at Wright Field in the crash of their de Havilland DH.4 after its wings collapsed during a dive while firing at ground targets with a new synchronized-through–the–propeller machine gun.  Patterson's grave and memorial arch is at Woodland Cemetery and Aborateum in Dayton, Ohio.

World War II

The area's World War II Army Air Fields had employment increase from approximately 3,700 in December 1939 to over 50,000 at the war's peak. Wright Field grew from approximately 30 buildings to a  facility with some 300 buildings and the Air Corps' first modern paved runways. The original part of the field became saturated with office and laboratory buildings and test facilities. The Hilltop area was acquired from private landowners in 1943–1944 to provide troop housing and services. 

The portion of Patterson Field from Huffman Dam through the Brick Quarters (including the command headquarters in Building 10262) at the south end of Patterson Field along Route 4 was administratively reassigned from Patterson Field to Wright Field. To avoid confusing the two areas of Wright Field, the south end of the former Patterson Field portion was designated "Area A", the original Wright Field became "Area B", and the north end of Patterson Field, including the flying field, "Area C."

In February 1940 at Wright Field, the Army Air Corps established the Technical Data Branch (Technical Data Section in July 1941, Technical Data Laboratory in 1942). After Air Corps Ferrying Command was established on 29 May 1941, on 21 June an installation point of the command opened at Patterson Field. The Flight Test Training unit of Air Technical Command was established at Wright Field on 9 September 1944 (moved to Patterson Field in 1946, Edwards AFB on 4 February 1951).

Two densely populated housing and service areas across Highway 444, Wood City and Skyway Park, were geographically separated from the central core of Patterson Field and developed almost self-sufficient community status. (Wood City was acquired in 1924 as part of the original donation of land to the government but was used primarily as just a radio range until World War II. Skyway Park was acquired in 1943.) They supported the vast numbers of recruits who enlisted and were trained at the two fields as well as thousands of civilian laborers, especially single women recruited to work at the depot. Skyway Park was demolished after the war. Wood City was eventually transformed into Kittyhawk Center, the base's modern commercial and recreation center.

In the fall of 1942, the first twelve "Air Force" officers to receive ATI field collection training were assigned to Wright Field for training in the technical aspects of "crash" intelligence (RAF Squadron Leader Colley identified how to obtain information from equipment marking plates and squadron markings.

The first German and Japanese aircraft arrived in 1943, and captured equipment soon filled six buildings, a large outdoor storage area, and part of a flight-line hangar for Technical Data Lab study (TDL closed its Army Aeronautical Museum). The World War II Operation Lusty returned 86 German aircraft to Wright Field for study, e.g., the Messerschmitt 262 jet fighter, while the post-war Operation Paperclip brought German scientists and technicians to Wright Field, e.g., Ernst R. G. Eckert (most of the scientists eventually went to work in the various Wright Field labs.)

UFO Studies / Sightings
Project Sign (Project Grudge in 1949, Project Blue Book in March 1952) was WPAFB's T-2 Intelligence investigations of unidentified flying objects (UFO) reports that began in July 1947. In 1951, the Air Technical Intelligence Center (ATIC) began analysis of crashed Soviet aircraft from the Korean war. In March 1952, ATIC established an Aerial Phenomena Group to study reported UFO sightings, including those in Washington, DC, in 1952. By 1969, the Foreign Technology Division (FTD) and its predecessor organizations had studied 12,618 reported sightings: 701 remained unexplained when the Air Force closed its UFO investigations, and a 1968 report concluded that "there seems to be no reason to attribute [the unexplained sightings] to an extraterrestrial source without much more convincing evidence."

The FTD sent all of its case files to the USAF Historical Research Center, which transferred them in 1976 to the National Archives and Records Service in Washington, DC, which became the permanent repository of the Project Sign/Grudge/Blue Book records. In a 1988 interview, Senator Barry Goldwater claimed he had asked Gen. Curtis LeMay for access to a secret UFO room at WPAFB and an angry LeMay said, "Not only can't you get into it but don't you ever mention it to me again."

Technical base
The Army Air Forces Technical Base (Air Force Technical Base before being designated a USAF base) was formed on 15 December 1945, under Brig Gen Joseph T. Morris, during the World War II drawdown by merging Wright Field, Patterson Field, Dayton Army Air Field, and—acquired by Wright Field for 1942 glider testing—Clinton Army Air Field. The Jamestown Radar Annex became a leased installation of the Technical Base in 1946, and the "custodial units at Dayton and Clinton County AAFlds were discontinued in 1946".

An 8000-foot concrete runway with 1000-foot runoffs at each end was built 1946–1947 in Area C to accommodate very heavy bombers, initially referred to locally as the "B-36 runway". The 1947 All-Altitude Speed Course at Vandalia became a detached installation of the Technical Base. After the USAF was created in September 1947, Morris' base headquarters was redesignated Headquarters, Air Force Technical Base, on 15 December 1947.

USAF base
Wright-Patterson Air Force Base was redesignated from the Air Force Technical Base on 13 January 1948—the former Wright Field Areas A and B remained, while Patterson Field became "Area C" and Skyway Park became "Area D" of the installation. In 1951 all locally based flying activities were moved to the Area B flight line. The 1948 All-Altitude Speed Course, later the Missile Tracking Annex, at Sulphur Grove, Ohio became a detached installation of Wright-Patt.

Headquarters, Air Engineering Development Division, was at WPAFB from 1 January 1950 to 14 November 1950, followed by the Air Research and Development Command from 16 November 1950 to 24 June 1951 (began move to Baltimore on 11 May 1951). By 1952 the WPAFB headquarters of the Wright Air Development Center (WADC) included a Plans and Operations Department (WOO) and Divisions for Aeronautics (WCN), Flight Test (WCT), Research (WCR), Weapons Components (WCE), Weapons Systems (WCS). On 15 February, WADC medical examinations "for the final selection of the Mercury astronauts were started" at the Aerospace Medical Laboratory (Wright-Patt test pilots Neil Armstrong and Ed White became NASA astronauts.)

From 6 March 1950 to 1 December 1951, Clinton County Air Force Base was assigned as a sub-base of WPAFB, and from 1950 to 1955, Wright-Patt had two Central Air Defense Force fighter-interceptor squadrons (1 from 1955 to 1960).

Cold War expansions
In 1954,  of land adjacent to the Mad River at the northeast boundary of the base, near the former location of the village of Osborn, were purchased for a Strategic Air Command dispersal site. Area D structures were demolished in 1957 (donated to the state in 1963 for Wright State University). In February 1958 the Wright Field (Area B) runways were closed to all jet traffic (1959 Area C operations included 139,276 takeoffs and landings, Area B had 44,699.) The West Ramp complex was built between August 1958 and July 1960.

The 4043rd Strategic Wing began KC-135 Stratotanker operations in February 1960 and B-52 Stratofortress operations in June 1960. On 1 July 1963, the wing was re-designated the 17th Bombardment Wing (Heavy) and continued its mission under this unit until 7 July 1975, when the last of its 11 B-52s was transferred to Beale Air Force Base, California. From 1957–1962, WADC's Hurricane Supersonic Research Site in Utah was a detached installation of Wright-Patt.

The NORAD Manual Air Defense Control Center for 58th Air Division interceptors was at Wright-Patterson AFB by 1958, and Brookfield Air Force Station near the Pennsylvania state line became operational as an April 1952 – January 1963 sub-base of WPAFB. The 1954–79 "Wright-Patterson Communications Facility #4" was at Yellow Springs, Ohio (which also had the 1965–77 Celestial Guidance Research Site.)

WPAFB also had an Army Air Defense Command Post for nearby Project Nike surface-to-air missile sites of the Cincinnati-Dayton Defense Area were at Wilmington (CD-27); Felicity (CD-46); Dillsboro (CD-63), and Oxford (CD-78). The AADCP activated in the spring of 1960 and moved to Wilmington—with BIRDIE CCCS—by 1965 (closed March 1971). Wilkins Air Force Station was a 1961–8 Air Defense Command station of Wright-Patt, and Gentile Air Force Station (later the Gentile Defense Electronics Supply Center) was assigned to the base on 1 July 1962.

In December 1975, Advanced Range Instrumentation Aircraft transferred to the 4950th Test Wing at WPAFB. Following the July 1992 merging of WPAFB labs, the base's Wright Laboratory included a Flight Dynamics Directorate. Superfund sites (39 initial areas) of WPAFB were found to be contaminated with chlorinated volatile organic compounds and benzene compounds (soils and groundwater), and an EPA/USAF Federal Facilities Agreement was signed in 1981 for remediation and continued investigation (the Installation Restoration Program for WPAFB identified 65 areas, including 13 landfills, 12 earth fill disposal zones, 9 fuel or chemical spill sites, 6 coal storage piles, 5 fire-training areas, 4 chemical burial sites, and 2 underground storage tanks). In November 1995, the "Dayton Peace Accords" held at WPAFB created the "Agreement for Peace in Bosnia and Herzegovina" signed in Paris on 14 December.

Huffman Prairie designation
Huffman Prairie was designated a National Historic Landmark in 1990 and named part of the 1992 Dayton Aviation Heritage National Historical Park. The West Ramp facility switched from the 4950th Test Wing to AFRC's 445th Airlift Wing with C-17 Globemaster III transports. The permanent party work force at WPAFB as of 30 September 2005, numbered 5,517 military and 8,102 civilian.

Dayton Agreement
In 1995, Alija Izetbegović, the President of Bosnia and Herzegovina; Franjo Tuđman, the President of Croatia; and Slobodan Milošević, the President of Serbia, arrived at Wright-Patterson AFB to commence negotiations to end the Bosnian War, an ethnic conflict that by 1995 was between the Bosnia and Herzegovina's Bosniaks and the Croats (who had put aside their differences) on one side versus Bosnia and Herzegovina's Serbs on the other side. American diplomat Richard Holbrooke led the negotiations. Eventually an agreement was made to have Bosnia and Herzegovina have two internal entities, a Bosniak-Croat federation known as the Federation of Bosnia and Herzegovina, and a Serb territory known as Republika Srpska.

2019–22 coronavirus pandemic
In response to the COVID-19 pandemic, the base sent airmen from the 88th Medical Group to Detroit for two months, where they setup a COVID-19 vaccination site in support of the Federal Emergency Management whole-of-government COVID response. The base sent medical Air Force professionals to New York City after airmen from the 445th Airlift Wing were deployed to aid the city's response.

Assignments

 Air Materiel Command, 9 March 1946
 Air Force Logistics Command, 1 April 1961
 Air Force Materiel Command, 1 July 1992

Units
In addition to the command headquarters, major units formerly assigned to Wright-Patterson Air Force Base include:

 Air Materiel Command Technical Intelligence Department, 10 October 1947 – 21 May 1951
 Redesignated: Air Technical Intelligence Center, 21 May 1951 – 1 July 1961
 USAF Technical Intelligence School, 1 May 1953 – 1 July 1961
 1702d Air Transport Group, 1 October 1948 – 17 July 1950

 58th Air Division, 8 September 1955 – 1 February 1959
 4043d Strategic Wing, 1 April 1959 – 1 February 1963
 17th Bombardment Wing, 1 July 1963 – 30 September 1975

Museum
Located adjacent to the base proper is the National Museum of the United States Air Force. The oldest and largest military aircraft museum in the world, it houses such aircraft as the only XB-70 Valkyrie in existence, an F-117 Nighthawk stealth fighter, and the World War II B-17 bomber, Memphis Belle.

Role and operations

Wright-Patterson AFB is "one of the largest, most diverse, and organizationally complex bases in the Air Force" with a long history of flight tests spanning from the Wright Brothers into the Space Age.

It is the headquarters of the Air Force Materiel Command, one of the major commands of the Air Force. "Wright-Patt" (as the base is colloquially called) is also the location of a major USAF Medical Center (hospital), the Air Force Institute of Technology, and the National Museum of the United States Air Force, formerly known as the U.S. Air Force Museum.

The 88th Air Base Wing consists of more than 5,000 officers, enlisted Air Force, civilian and contractor employees responsible for three primary mission areas: operating the installation; deploying expeditionary Airmen in support of the Global War on Terrorism; and defending the base and its people.

It is also the home base of the 445th Airlift Wing of the Air Force Reserve Command, an Air Mobility Command-gained unit which flies the C-17 Globemaster heavy airlifter. Wright-Patterson is also the headquarters of the Air Force Life Cycle Management Center and the Air Force Research Laboratory.

Wright-Patterson is the host of the annual United States Air Force Marathon which occurs the weekend closest to the Air Force's anniversary.

The base conducts neurotechnology research.

Based units
Flying and notable non-flying units based at Wright-Patterson Air Force Base.

Units marked GSU are Geographically Separate Units, which although based at Wright-Patterson, are subordinate to a parent unit based at another location.

United States Air Force
 

Air Force Materiel Command (AFMC)
 Headquarters Air Force Materiel Command
 Air Force Life Cycle Management Center
 Headquarters Air Force Life Cycle Management Center
 21st Intelligence Squadron
 645th Aeronautical Systems Group
 Business & Enterprise Systems Directorate
 Financial Systems Division (GSU)
 Propulsion Directorate
 Propulsion Acquisition Division (GSU)
 Rapid Sustainment Directorate
 Fighters & Advanced Aircraft Directorate
 Advanced Aircraft Division
 Special Programs Division
 F-15 FMS Division
 Bombers Directorate
 Strike Systems Division
 B-2 Spirit Division
 Air Force Security Assistance & Cooperation Directorate
 International Logistics Support Division
 Global Facilities Support Division
 Financial Management & Comptroller Division
 International Division
 Contract Execution Division
 Central Division
 Policy & Programs Division
 Operations Division
 Information Technology Services Division
 Intelligence, Surveillance and Reconnaissance & Special Operations Forces Directorate
 RQ-4 Global Hawk & U-2 Dragon Lady Division
 Medium Altitude Unmanned Aerial Systems Division
 Intelligence, Surveillance and Reconnaissance Sensors & FMS Division
 Special Operations Forces & Personnel Recovery Division
 Helicopter Program Office
 Attack Systems Directorate
 Joint Strike Fighter Directorate
 Mobility & Training Aircraft Directorate
 International Acquisition Programs Division
 T-7 Division
 KC-46 Division
 Agile Combat Support Directorate
 Portfolio Analysis Division
 Foreign Military Sales Division
 Simulators Division
 Human Systems Division
 Presidential & Executive Aircraft Directorate
 VC-25B "Next Air Force One" Division
 Acquisition Excellence Directorate
 Personnel Directorate
 Engineering Directorate
 Judge Advocate Office
 Financial Management Directorate
 Information Protection Directorate
 Logistics Directorate
 Contracting Directorate
 Plans & Programs Directorate
 Small Business Office
 Safety Office
 Program Execution Directorate
 Test & Evaluation Division
 Personnel Execution Directorate
 Technical Engineering Directorate
 Architecture & Integration Directorate
 Financial Management Mission Execution Directorate
 Logistics Services Directorate
 Contract Execution Directorate
 Plans & Programs Execution Directorate
 Center Information Technology Office
 Intelligence Directorate
 88th Air Base Wing (Host wing)
 Headquarters 88th Air Base Wing
 United States Air Force Marathon Office
 88th Comptroller Squadron
 88th Operations Support Squadron
 88th Medical Group
 88th Inpatient Operations Squadron
 88th Dental Squadron
 88th Diagnostics and Therapeutics Squadron
 88th Healthcare Operations Squadron
 88th Surgical Operations Squadron
 88th Operational Medical Readiness Squadron
 88th Medical Support Squadron
 88th Civil Engineer Group
 88th Civil Engineer Squadron
 788th Civil Engineer Squadron
 88th Mission Support Group
 88th Communications Squadron
 88th Force Support Squadron
 88th Security Forces Squadron
 88th Logistics Readiness Squadron

 National Museum of the United States Air Force

 Air Force Installation and Mission Support Center
 Detachment 6 (GSU)
 Air Force Installation Contracting Center (GSU)

Air Force Research Laboratory
 Headquarters Air Force Research Laboratory
711th Human Performance Wing
 Airman Systems Directorate
 Human Systems Integration Directorate
US Air Force School of Aerospace Medicine
 Air Force Research Laboratory D'Azzo Research Library
 Air Vehicles Directorate
 Materials and Manufacturing Directorate
 Propulsion Directorate
 Sensors Directorate

Air Education and Training Command (AETC)

 Air University
 Detachment 1 (GSU)
 Air Force Institute of Technology (GSU)
 Mission Support Directorate
 Communications & Information Directorate
 Financial Management Directorate
 Requirements, Plans & Programs Directorate
 Safety Directorate
 Security Directorate
 Judge Advocate
 The Civil Engineer School
 Civilian Institution Programs
 The Graduate School of Engineering & Management
 The School of Strategic Force Studies
 The School of Systems & Logistics
 Air Force Recruiting Service
 360th Recruiting Group
 338th Recruiting Squadron (GSU)

Air Mobility Command (AMC)
 375th Air Mobility Wing
 375th Operations Group
 Detachment 4 (GSU)

Air Combat Command (ACC)

 Sixteenth Air Force
 688th Cyberspace Wing
 690th Cyberspace Operations Group
 83rd Network Operations Squadron
 Detachment 3 (GSU)
 First Air Force
 Headquarters Civil Air Patrol-United States Air Force (HQ CAP-USAF)
 Great Lakes Region Liaison Office (GSU)

Air Force District of Washington (AFDW)

 US Air Force Bands
 The United States Air Force Band of Flight

Air Force Field Operating Agency (FOA)

 National Air and Space Intelligence Center
 Directorate of Communications and Information
 Directorate of Personnel
 Directorate of Facilities and Logistics
 Directorate of Plans and Operations
 Air and Cyberspace Intelligence Group
 Aircraft Analysis Squadron 
 Operational Requirements Squadron 
 Information Warfare Analysis Squadron
 Integrated Command, Control, Communications, Computers Intelligence Surveillance and Reconnaissance Analysis Squadron
 Geospatial and Signatures Intelligence Group
 Persistent Infrared Analysis Squadron
 Measurements and Signatures Intelligence Analysis Squadron
 Geospatial Intelligence Analysis Squadron
 Global Exploitation Intelligence Group
 Regional Threats Analysis Squadron 
 Future Threats Analysis Squadron 
 Foreign Materiel Exploitation Squadron
 Global Activities Squadron
 Signals Analysis Squadron
 Space, Missiles and Forces Intelligence Group
 Ballistic Missile Analysis Squadron
 Special Analysis Squadron
 Air Force Office of Special Investigations
 1st Federal Investigations Region (GSU)
 Headquarters 1st Federal Investigations Region
 Headquarters Operating Location Alpha
 10th Federal Investigations Squadron 
 Procurement Fraud
 Detachment 4 (GSU)
 Special Projects
 Headquarters Operating Location Charlie (GSU)
 Detachment 2 (GSU)
 Air Force Legal Operations Agency
 Air Force Claims Service Center (GSU)
 Air Force Audit Agency
 Acquisition, Logistics, and Financial Management Directorate (GSU)
 Field Activities Directorate
 Operating Location Wright-Patterson (GSU)
 Air Force Manpower Analysis Agency
 Operating Location Wright-Patterson (GSU)
 Air Force Personnel Center
 Operating Location Wright-Patterson (GSU)
 Air Reserve Personnel Center
 Headquarters Individual Reservist Readiness Integration Organization (HQ RIO)
 Detachment 4
 Operating Location Wright-Patterson (GSU)

Air Force Reserve Command (AFRC)

 Fourth Air Force
 445th Airlift Wing
 Headquarters 445th Airlift Wing
 445th Aeromedical Staging Squadron
 445th Aerospace Medicine Squadron
 445th Operations Group
 89th Airlift Squadron – C-17A Globemaster III
 445th Aeromedical Evacuation Squadron
 445th Operations Support Squadron
 445th Maintenance Group
 445th Aircraft Maintenance Squadron
 445th Maintenance Squadron
 445th Mission Support Group
 87th Aerial Port Squadron
 445th Civil Engineer Squadron
 445th Communications Element
 445th Force Support Squadron
 445th Logistics Readiness Squadron
 445th Military Personnel Flight
 445th Security Forces Squadron
 Tenth Air Force
 655th Intelligence, Surveillance and Reconnaissance Wing
 Headquarters 655th Intelligence, Surveillance and Reconnaissance Wing
 655th Intelligence, Surveillance and Reconnaissance Group
 14th Intelligence Squadron
 64th Intelligence Squadron
 71st Intelligence Squadron

Civil Air Patrol (CAP)
 Great Lakes Region
 Ohio Wing
 Group 7 (GSU)
 Headquarters Group 7
 Wright Patterson Composite Squadron

United States Space Force
Space Operations Command (SpOC)
 Space Delta 7
 73rd Intelligence, Surveillance and Reconnaissance Squadron (GSU)
 Space Delta 18
 1st Space Analysis Squadron
 2nd Space Analysis Squadron

United States Army
United States Army Reserve (USAR)
 Military Intelligence Readiness Command
 National Intelligence Support Group
 2100th Military Intelligence Group (GSU)

United States Marine Corps

Marine Forces Reserve (MARFORRES)
 Force Headquarters Group
 4th Law Enforcement Battalion
 Military Police Company Charlie (GSU)

United States Department of the Navy

Bureau of Medicine and Surgery (BUMED)
 Naval Medical Research Center
 Naval Medical Research Unit Dayton (GSU)

Department of Defense
Defense Security Cooperation University (DSCU)

 Defense Institute of Security Cooperation Studies

Defense Logistics Agency (DLA)
 Defense Automated Addressing System

Geography
Wright-Patterson Air Force Base includes Area A (former Patterson Field and Wood City area) and Area B (former Wright Field). The USGS Geographic Names Information System separately designates the military installation, the airport, and the census-designated place (CDP). The southwest end of the base, now the National Museum of the United States Air Force, is within the city of Riverside in Montgomery County.

Demographics
In 2010, Wright-Patt had a total of 27,406 military, civilian and contract employees. As of the census of 2000, there were 6,656 people, 1,754 households, and 1,704 families residing on the base. The population density was 219.8/km2 (569.2/sq mi). There were 2,096 housing units at an average density of 69.2/km2 (179.2/sq mi). The racial makeup of the base was 76.11% White, 15.25% Black or African American, 0.45% Native American, 2.30% Asian, 0.12% Pacific Islander, 2.09% from other races, and 3.68% from two or more races. Hispanic or Latino of any race were 4.45% of the population.

There were 1,754 households, out of which 78.1% had children under the age of 18 living with them, 89.0% were married couples living together, 6.1% had a female householder with no husband present, and 2.8% were non-families. 2.6% of all households were made up of individuals, and none had someone living alone who was 65 years of age or older. The average household size was 3.60 and the average family size was 3.64.

On the base the population was spread out, with 42.5% under the age of 18, 11.6% from 18 to 24, 41.5% from 25 to 44, 4.2% from 45 to 64, and 0.2% who were 65 years of age or older. The median age was 23 years. For every 100 females there were 105.2 males. For every 100 females age 18 and over, there were 104.1 males.

The median income for a household on the base was $43,342, and the median income for a family was $43,092. Males had a median income of $30,888 versus $21,044 for females. The per capita income for the base was $15,341. About 1.6% of families and 1.8% of the population were below the poverty line, including 2.4% of those under age 18 and none of those age 65 or over.

As of 30 September 2005, Wright-Patterson had base housing amounting to 2,012 single-family units, 300 units for unaccompanied enlisted personnel, and 455 visitor or temporary living units.

Environmental problems
In May 2016, the Ohio Environmental Protection Agency ordered a drinking water well on the base to be shut down because of water contamination with perfluorooctane sulfonate (PFOS), a persistent chemical used in firefighting foam. April 2016 water samples from two wells showed 110 parts per trillion of PFOS, which is above the new EPA lifetime threshold of 70 parts per trillion. In June 2016, the EPA asked the base commander to speedily clean up the wells to prevent the contaminants from reaching more wells on base and Dayton's seven drinking water wells at Huffman Dam. Base officials stated in June 2020 that the on-base ground water tests confirmed that current PFOS contamination is below EPA required levels, a claim the City of Dayton disputes.

In popular culture
Hangar 18 in Area B is purported to be the repository of a crashed UFO from Roswell, New Mexico and UFO research in general.

Thrash metal band Megadeth released the song "Hangar 18" on their 1990 album Rust in Peace.

In Season 2, Episode 8, the History Channel's series Project Blue Book makes mention of "Hangar 18" being a storage facility the Roswell crash UFO and other alien artifacts.

The base was featured in the young adult book series The 5th Wave and the 2016 film of the same name as the base of operations for "The Others".

Notable person
Steve Hertz, baseball player and coach, born on the base

References

External links

 Logistics Management Careers
 
 

Historic American Engineering Record documentation, filed under Dayton, Montgomery County, OH:

 
Historic American Engineering Record in Ohio
Installations of the United States Air Force in Ohio
1948 establishments in Ohio
Military airbases established in 1948
Research installations of the United States Air Force
Military Superfund sites
Census-designated places in Greene County, Ohio
Installations of Strategic Air Command
Superfund sites in Ohio
UFO culture in the United States